This article contains technical details about the rotors of the Enigma machine. Understanding the way the machine encrypts requires taking into account the current position of each rotor, the ring setting and its internal wiring.

Physical design of rotors

Rotor electrical view

No letter can map to itself, a cryptographic weakness caused by the same wires being used for forwards and backwards legs.

Rotor  offset 
The effect of rotation on the rotors can be demonstrated with some examples.

As an example, let us take rotor type I of Enigma I (see table below) without any ring setting offset. Notice that every letter is encoded into another.

Notice that the wirings are connected as a loop between two letters.

When a rotor has stepped, the offset must be taken into account to know what the output is, and where it enters the next rotor.

Because of the offset this  enters the next rotor in the  position.

Ring setting
The ring settings, or Ringstellung, are used to change the position of the internal wiring relative to the rotor. They do not change the notch or the alphabet ring on the exterior. Those are fixed to the rotor. Changing the ring setting will therefore change the positions of the wiring, relative to the turnover-point and start position.

The ring setting will rotate the wiring.

As mentioned before these encodings only happen after the key is pressed and the rotor has turned. Tracing the signal on the rotors  is therefore only possible if a key is pressed while the rotors were in the position .

Rotor wiring tables
This table shows how the internal wiring connects the right side of the rotor (with the spring-loaded contacts) to the left side. Each rotor is a simple substitution cipher. The letters are listed as connected to alphabet order.

Terminology
The reflector is also known as the reversing drum or, from the German, the Umkehrwalze or UKW.

Technical comments related to Enigma modifications 1939-1945.

Swiss K 
In 1941 it became known to the Swiss that some of their Enigma traffic was being read by the French. It was decided to make some design modifications.
 One of the modifications consisted in modifying the wheel stepping on the Swiss Army machine. The slow, left-hand wheel was made stationary during operation while the second wheel stepped with every key stroke.
 The third wheel and the UKW would step in the normal fashion with Enigma stepping for the third wheel.
 The stationary but rotatable left-hand wheel was meant to make up for the missing stecker connections on the commercial machine.
Swiss Army Enigma machines were the only machines modified. The surviving Swiss Air Force machines do not show any signs of  modification. Machines used by the diplomatic service apparently were not altered either.

Turnover notch positions 
The single turnover notch positioned on the left side (plate connector side) of the rotor triggers the stepping motion by engaging the ratchet teeth of the wheel to the left. Later rotors had two turnover notches. The table below lists the turnover notch point of each rotor.

Normalized Enigma sequences 
In the following examples you can observe a normal step sequence and a double step sequence. It is the right rotor's behavior we observe here (turnover ).

Normal sequence:

   — normal step of right rotor
   — right rotor (III) goes in V—notch position
   — right rotor takes middle rotor one step further
   — normal step of right rotor

Double step sequence:
   — normal step of right rotor
   — right rotor (III) goes in V—notch position
   — right rotor steps, takes middle rotor (II) one step further, which is now in its own E—notch position
   — normal step of right rotor, double step of middle rotor, normal step of left rotor
   — normal step of right rotor

Fourth rotor

The introduction of the fourth rotor was anticipated because captured material dated January 1941 had made reference to the development of a fourth rotor wheel; indeed, the wiring of the new fourth rotor had already been worked out.

On 1 February 1942, the Enigma messages began to be encoded using a new Enigma version that had been brought into use. The previous 3-rotor Enigma model had been modified with the old reflector replaced by a thin rotor and a new thin reflector. Breaking Shark on 3-rotor bombes would have taken 50 to 100 times as long as an average Air Force or Army message. It seemed, therefore, that effective, fast, 4-rotor bombes were the only way forward.  Encoding mistakes by cipher clerks allowed the British to determine the wiring of the new reflector and its rotor.

References

External links
enigvar2.pdf
enigmabombe.htm
ultraenigmawirings.htm
g-312.zip

Enigma machine